The budget of the U.S. state of California is made up of several funds derived from taxes. The General Fund makes up 3/4th of the entire budget; it allocates monies to state operations and payments to localities. The annual budget is proposed by the California State Legislature and approved by the Governor of California, who enjoys the prerogative of line-item veto.

California's tax system 
California levies a 9.3 percent maximum variable rate income tax, with six tax brackets, collecting about $40 billion per year (representing approximately 51% of General Fund revenue and 40% of tax revenue overall in FY2007). California has a state sales tax of 8.25%, which can total up to 10.75% with local sales tax included. All real property is taxable annually, the tax based on the property's fair market value at the time of purchase or completion of new construction. Property tax increases are capped at 2% per year (see Proposition 13).

One notable side effect of California's tax structure is that a substantial portion of the state's income comes from a small proportion of wealthy citizens. For example, it is estimated that in 2004 the richest 3% of state taxpayers (those with tax returns showing over $200,000 in yearly income) paid approximately 60% of state income taxes.

Surplus 
California is predicted to have a budget surplus of several billion dollars for 2019. This is helped by the state's record low unemployment rate of 4.0% for 2019.

California public spending 

State spending increased from $56 billion in 1998 to $131 billion in 2008, and the state was facing a budget deficit of $40 billion in 2008. 

California faced a $26.3 billion budget deficit for the 2009–2010 budget year. While the legislative bodies appeared to address the problem in 2008 with the three-month delayed passage of a budget they in fact only postponed the deficit to 2009 and due to the late 2008 decline in the economy and the credit crisis the problem became urgent in November 2008.

California faced another budget gap for 2010, with $72 billion in debt. California faced a massive and still-growing debt.

In June 2009 Gov. Arnold Schwarzenegger said "Our wallet is empty, our bank is closed and our credit is dried up."

2012 brought somewhat of an improvement to state finances, though the state still faced a $16 billion budget deficit for the year. To help alleviate this, Governor Jerry Brown introduced proposals to bring measures to voters, in order to pass tax increases.  If these are not passed, more severe cuts are expected.  California's unemployment rate also fell from a high above 12.4% to below 11% in 2012.

In 2017 a miscalculation of the costs for the state's Medi-Cal program of $1.9 billion in 2016 led Governor Jerry Brown to project the state of California will face a $1.6 billion budget deficit. As of January 2017, California and Kansas were the only two western states with an AA- bond credit rating.

Public borrowing
California uses two kinds of tax anticipation notes: Revenue Anticipation Notes (RANS), which are issued and paid back within a fiscal year, and Revenue Anticipation Warrants (RAWS), which are issued on a fiscal year and paid back the following fiscal year. RANS are commonly used due to the delay between expenditure and tax collection while RAWS are only used in times of crisis.

References

External links 
 

Government of California
Economy of California
State government finances in the United States